800XP may refer to:

Gobosh 800XP, American light-sport aircraft
Hawker 800XP, American business jet aircraft